Annan is a 1999 Tamil language drama film directed by Anu Mohan. The film stars Ramarajan and Swathi, with Manivannan, R. Sundarrajan, newcomer Vaasan, newcomer Apoorva, Vadivukkarasi and Ponvannan playing supporting roles. It was released on 29 March 1999.

Plot

Velan (Ramarajan) is the manager of the village market and is a respected man. He loves dearly his only sister Lakshmi (Apoorva) who is the village's school teacher. Sundari (Swathi) and her father (R. Sundarrajan) come to Velan's village. Velan and Sundari fall in love with each other whereas Lakshmi and the rural development officer Selvam (Vaasan) fall in love with each other. In the meantime, Velan and the village chief Rasappan (Manivannan) decide to arrange the marriage between Lakshmi and the wicked Rasappan's son Manikkam (Ponvannan). One day, Selvam breaks the village's rule and he is beaten at the village court. Lakshmi finally reveals the love between them and they get married. Selvam is not a rural development officer but a police officer who urges to arrest Velan. In the past, Velan killed a local rowdy who was, in fact, Selvam's father. Selvam arrests Velan and Velan is sent to jail. Manikkam becomes the new manager of the village market. Without sufficient evidence, the court releases Velan and he comes back to his village. Now, Velan has to face Selvam and Manikkam. What transpires later forms the crux of the story.

Cast

Ramarajan as Velan
Swathi as Sundari
Manivannan as Rasappan
R. Sundarrajan as Sundari’s father
Seenu as Selvam
Apoorva as Lakshmi
Vadivukkarasi as Guruvamma, Selvam's mother
Ponvannan as Manikkam
Pandu as Sangu
Balu Anand
Vishwanath
Rajappa
Rajendra Kumar
Chinnakannu
Kanthan
K. Rameshraj
R. S. Samiraj
Padmanabhan
Nadrayan
Chatur Sethupathi
Ashokrajan
Master Jafar
Baby Kavitha
Chelladurai
Kottai Perumal
Kovai Senthil as Ayyakannu
Anuja
Kalpana

Soundtrack

The film score and the soundtrack were composed by Ilaiyaraaja. The soundtrack, released in 1999, features 6 tracks with lyrics written by Gangai Amaran, Mu. Metha, Kamakodiyan and Arivumathi.

References

1999 films
1990s Tamil-language films
Films scored by Ilaiyaraaja
Indian drama films
1999 drama films